{{Infobox film
| name = Three Flavours Cornetto
| image = The Three Colours Cornetto Trilogy logo.png
| caption = Official film series logo
| director = Edgar Wright
| producer = 
The Three Flavours Cornetto trilogy (also sometimes referred to as the Cornetto trilogy or the Blood and Ice Cream trilogy) is an anthology series of British comedic genre films directed by Edgar Wright, written by Wright and Simon Pegg, produced by Nira Park, and starring Pegg and Nick Frost. The trilogy consists of Shaun of the Dead (2004), Hot Fuzz (2007), and The World's End (2013).

The trilogy of films does not share a storyline or broad themes, and is named after its repeated passing references to Cornetto ice cream cones. They were produced on a total budget of $38 million, and the films have grossed more than $156 million worldwide, and all three films have garnered widespread critical acclaim. In addition to brief references to the Cornetto ice cream brand, the films have other common elements: each one depicts romance and struggles with maturity as recurring themes.

The name is also a reference to the French  Three Colours trilogy (1993-1994) by director Krzysztof Kieślowski.

Films

Shaun of the Dead
The first film is Shaun of the Dead, a 2004  romantic zombie comedy film (self-dubbed "rom-zom-com"). Pegg plays Shaun, a man attempting to gain focus in his life as he deals with his girlfriend, his mother and stepfather in the midst of an apocalyptic uprising of zombies. 

The trilogy's Cornetto reference begins with a scene in which Shaun buys a cone for his friend Ed (Frost) at his request as Ed wakes up groggy and badly hung over after a night of drinking. Director Edgar Wright has said that he used to use Cornettos as a hangover cure.

Hot Fuzz
The second entry is Hot Fuzz, a 2007 buddy cop action comedy. Pegg and Frost play police officers who investigate a series of mysterious deaths in a small English village; Danny Butterman (Frost) grew up there and Nicholas Angel (Pegg) is an outsider, accustomed to the fast-paced busy life of London law enforcement. The two officers purchase Cornetto cones at a convenience store at various times, and a scrap of the wrapper falls onto the counter when Angel later makes other purchases at a motorway service station.

The World's End
The third installment is The World's End, a 2013 science fiction apocalyptic comedy. The film follows a group of friends, led by Pegg, reattempting an epic pub crawl during an alien occupation of their home town. In the final scene of the film, a Cornetto wrapper blows past in a breeze, briefly catching on a wire fence.

Wright said in an interview for Entertainment Weekly, "We thought it would be a funny idea to do a sci-fi film where even the people who are going to be your saviours are hammered."

Connections and themes

The name originates from a "silly joke" during the promotion of Hot Fuzz. Wright had written in Cornetto ice cream as a hangover cure for Frost's character in Shaun of the Dead, based on his own experiences. At the after party for the film, they received free Cornetto ice creams so Wright and Pegg decided to include another reference to Cornetto in their next film in a failed attempt to get more free ice cream. In Hot Fuzz, Wright included a couple of brief throwaway scenes that referred to the Cornetto joke in Shaun. On the promotional tour of Hot Fuzz during production of The World's End, one interviewer pointed out the use of Cornetto in the first two films, and Wright jokingly said that they represent a trilogy comparable to Krzysztof Kieślowski's Three Colours film trilogy.

Wright seriously considered the three films as a trilogy, and wrote The World's End to complete themes set out in the earlier films, adding a Cornetto reference to the film. Each film in the trilogy is connected to a specific Cornetto flavour appearing in each film. Shaun of the Dead features a strawberry-flavoured Cornetto, which signifies the film's bloody and gory elements, Hot Fuzz includes the blue original Cornetto, to signify the police element to the film, and The World's End features the green mint chocolate chip flavour (though shown only by a wrapper caught in the wind) representing "little green men" and science fiction. According to Wright, Wall's, manufacturer of the Cornetto, was "very pleased with the namecheck".

Wright considered each of the films a "Trojan horse", "genre films that have a relationship comedy smuggled inside a zombie movie, a cop movie and a sci-fi movie". Thematically, Wright saw each of the films containing common themes of "the individuals in a collective [...] about growing up and [...] about the dangers of perpetual adolescence". Wright reworked the script of The World's End to conclude on these themes. The films are further linked by a common set of actors. Wright, Park, Pegg, and Frost collaborated previously in the TV series Spaced from 1999 to 2001. Martin Freeman, Bill Nighy, Rafe Spall, Julia Deakin, Patricia Franklin, and Garth Jennings appear in each of the films as well as other projects by Wright and Pegg. Clark Collis observes in Entertainment Weekly that the films also feature "a running gag involving garden fences".

Recurring cast
Discussing The World's End, Wright said that any actor who appeared in the first two films would also appear in the third, adding, "We even got back Nicola Cunningham, who played Mary the zombie in Shaun of the Dead. And Mark Donovan, so the first two zombies from Shaun of the Dead are in this. The twins are in it."

Reception

Box office

Critical response

References

External links

Film series introduced in 2004
Films directed by Edgar Wright
Films with screenplays by Simon Pegg
Films with screenplays by Edgar Wright
Comedy film series
Trilogies
Anthology film series
British film series